The city of Ottawa, Ontario, Canada maintains many regional roads, like most counties and regional municipalities in Southern and Eastern Ontario. The regional road system was created by the Regional Municipality of Ottawa-Carleton (RMOC) and managed by the RMOC until 2001. In 2001, when all six cities, four townships, and one village within the former RMOC amalgamated to form the new city of Ottawa, responsibility of the regional road system was transferred to the new city of Ottawa, and they became today's “Ottawa roads”.

In general, even-numbered routes run east-west and odd-numbered routes run north-south. Also, the lowest-numbered routes are generally found in the southern part of the city for even (east-west) numbered routes, and in the western part for odd (north-south) numbered routes. This pattern, however, has many exceptions. As more roads were added to the numbered-road system, the availability of numbers decreased and consequently, the numbering pattern had to be broken.

In smaller communities and rural areas the numbered roads are, for the most part, adequately signed with trapezoid-shaped signs with rounded corners, which are often referred to as "flowerpots" due to the shape of the sign. Older signs installed prior to 2001 have the legend "Ottawa-Carleton" at the top with the route number underneath. Newer signs installed after 2001 use the legend "Ottawa" or simply the "O" portion of the city's wordmark. Most numbered-road signs are not marked with directional tabs indicating the direction of the road (i.e. North, South, East, West), but where these appear, they are always printed in both English and French.

Most numbered roads in the urban areas of Ottawa are not signed with route numbers, despite having official route numbers and being listed on many maps with these numbers. Instead, most urban sections of numbered roads are referred to by their names. Ottawa's city council adopted an updated route-numbering policy in 2005, under which road numbers are no longer posted inside the Greenbelt except for significant roads such as Ottawa Road 174, a former provincial highway, which is now usually known as "The 174". This effectively makes most Ottawa Roads within the greenbelt only used for internal purposes, as they are not signed. This is especially the case for Ottawa Roads 70, 78, 82, 105, and 113 which have little to no public record, due to the fact that they were likely numbered after numbering was discontinued in the downtown core. 

During the mass downloading of Ontario's provincial highways onto regional authorities in 1997 and 1998, the former Regional Municipality of Ottawa-Carleton was given responsibility over former Highways 16, 31, 44, and the section of 17 east of Highway 417. These former highways became known as Regional Roads (subsequently Ottawa Roads) 73, 31, 49, and 174, respectively.

List

Former Numbered Roads

General Patterns

Even-numbered roads (East-West Direction)

Odd-numbered roads (North-South Direction)

See also

List of roads in Ottawa
List of Ontario county numbered roads
GeoOttawa (City of Ottawa's mapping software; only shows road numbers in rural areas)
Official road map of Ontario (shows most major numbered roads in Ontario)
Map of Ottawa (2007) (Displays most numbered roads as of 2007)
City of Ottawa Official Plan Maps (Display most numbered roads)
Ottawa-Carleton Regional Roads Report

References

Roads in Ottawa
Ontario county roads
Roads, Numbered
Ottawa